Temmler Werke GmbH was founded in Detmold in 1917 by Hermann Temmler. The Temmler Group is a German pharmaceutical company, which focuses on the production, sale and contract production of pharmaceutical products. In 2012, the Temmler Group was taken over by the Aenova Group and with its seven production sites is one of the largest European pharmaceutical contract manufacturers.

History

The Temmler-Werke was founded in Detmold in 1917 by Hermann Temmler. In 1919, it merged with the Vereinigte Chemische Fabriken GmbH in Detmold to form the Vereinigten Chemischen Fabriken H. Temmler pharmaceutical company. In 1925, its headquarters was re-located to Berlin. Preparations for the treatment and alleviation of respiratory diseases became the hallmark of Temmler Pharma.

From 1933, the company, with expanded production facilities, concentrated its business activities exclusively around the Berlin area. In 1938, a Temmler chemist in Berlin synthesised Pervitin (methamphetamine-hydrochloride), the pharmaceutical drug was then manufactured and dispensed over-the-counter to the public as a central nervous system and circulatory system analeptic, psychiatric performance enhancing stimulant and to induce or extend wakefulness to treat narcolepsy. Pervitin was made available and packaged in thirty tablet oral dosage form, and in six 1ccm glass ampulla form as an intramuscular or intravenous injectable. The company became especially known for the introduction of its methamphetamine-hydrochloride preparation brand Pervitin, which the company produced from 1938 up until 1988. 

According to a Der Spiegel article in 2005, Nazi Germany believed that Pervitin could also help win World War II, so the German armed forces was supplied with more than 38 million Pervitin tablets, especially during Germany's "Blitzkrieg" invasion of Poland and the Battle of France during 1939/40 where it was introduced to soldiers to attenuate anxiety and increase performance and concentration.

In 1945, the facility in East Berlin was occupied and disassembled. The company had to be completely reassembled in Hamburg. The company traded under the name Preuss & Temmler AG. The production facilities in East Berlin were sequestered and partially dismantled in 1945, placed under trusteeship from 1946 and expropriated in 1949.

In 1960, the whole company transferred from Hamburg to Marburg.

The Hessian state government awarded the complex, an area of about 40,000 m² of production and administration facilities, a prize for functional and architectural design.

In 1967, the production and storage facilities were extended.

In 1971, a new laboratory building was erected for the manufacture of pharmaceutical dosage forms and active ingredients for controlled release. It became possible, for example, to produce medicinal products in the form of retard pellets releasing their active ingredients when required and over a longer period of time.

In 1982, these retard preparations marked the beginning of contract manufacturing, initially for foreign firms only.

Commencing 1989, the production also comprised all solid pharmaceutical dosage forms for customers at home and abroad.

In 1990, Temmler Pharma became part of the ASTA Medica group. Besides medicinal products for gastroenterology and migraine/pain, pulmology become the focal point of the preparations programme.

In 1998, Temmler Pharma took over 17 established products, thus extending its product range to include pharmaceutical preparations for the treatment of central nervous system disorders.

Since 1999, Temmler Pharma is once again in private hands.

In 2004, the laboratory building was extended by adding two additional floors to 2,500 m², thus laying the foundation for further growth in the field of pharmaceutical development and contract manufacturing services.

A complex comprising 1,380 m² housing production facilities to meet future GMP and FDA standards was erected in 2005. Solid pharmaceutical dosage forms, such as tablets and capsules, and particularly retard formulations, are manufactured at this site.

2007 The acquisition of three European production sites (Germany, Ireland, Italy) from the Japanese pharmaceutical company Astellas on January 1 led to the formation of the Temmler Group, considerably extending production capacities and technological possibilities.

The Temmler Group acquires two further production sites in Feldkirchen and Bruckmühl.

In 2008, with the acquisition of the SwissCo group, based in Sisseln, Switzerland, the Temmler group further develops its competence in the processing of moisture sensitive active substances. The production of effervescent tablets is the chief work of SwissCo.

Today Temmler is one of the leading contract manufacturers in the pharmaceutical industry.

In 2012, Temmler's production facility acquired by Aenova and Temmler's neurology products with the commercial infrastructure and pipeline acquired by major pharma Lupin Limited.

See also 
 Methamphetamine

References

External links
 Official website http://www.temmler.eu
 Temmler factory, Berlin: image gallery, demolished in autumn 2015

Chemical companies of Germany
Companies based in Hesse
Multinational companies
Pharmaceutical companies of Germany
Pharmaceutical companies established in 1917
Medical and health organisations based in Hesse